WKGV (104.1 FM) is a Contemporary Christian radio station licensed to Swansboro, North Carolina. It is an affiliate of K-Love and is owned by Educational Media Foundation.

History
Jack Lee, manager of WFAI in Fayetteville, North Carolina from 1960 to 1971, was general manager of WZXS when it played adult standards.

WWTB "Unforgettable Radio" signed off in January 2004 when new owner Sea-Comm announced the station would begin airing the same programming as WLTT "The Big Talker".

In 2007, Educational Media Foundation agreed to buy WWTB from Sea-Comm for $900,000. WWTB moved its frequency from 103.9 to 104.1, and its city of license from Topsail Beach to Swansboro. The former WBNE became WNTB, taking over the WLTT simulcast.

References

External links

K-Love radio stations
Radio stations established in 1994
1994 establishments in North Carolina
Educational Media Foundation radio stations
KGB